Charles Anthony "Tony" Suck, Born:Charles Anthony Zuck (June 11, 1858 – January 29, 1895) was an American Major League Baseball player from Chicago, Illinois, who mainly played catcher for three teams over the span of two seasons. He debuted for the  Buffalo Bisons of the National League. He only played in two games, and had no base hits in seven at-bats.

A highly regarded individual in the Chicago and minor league baseball communities, he was well liked for his easygoing nature and played amateur and semi-professional ball nearly to the end of his life, which occurred at the age of 36 after a bout with pneumonia, and was interred at Oak Woods Cemetery.

References

External links

 
 Futility Infielder - Two part article.

1858 births
1895 deaths
19th-century baseball players
Baseball players from Chicago
Major League Baseball catchers
Buffalo Bisons (NL) players
Chicago Browns/Pittsburgh Stogies players
Baltimore Monumentals players
Deaths from pneumonia in Illinois
Fort Wayne Hoosiers players
Brooklyn Grays (Interstate Association) players
Augusta Browns players
Charleston Quakers players
Memphis Browns players